is a tram station operated by Toei's  Tokyo Sakura Tram located in Arakawa, Tokyo Japan. It is 0.3 kilometres from the terminus of the Tokyo Sakura Tram at Minowabashi Station.

Layout
Arakawa-itchumae Station has two opposed side platforms.

Surrounding area
 Arakawa Municipal Dai-ichi Junior High School   .  Joyful Minowa (traditional shopping arcade)

History
 November 11, 2000: Station opened

Railway stations in Tokyo
Railway stations in Japan opened in 2000
Arakawa, Tokyo
Toden Arakawa Line